The Mulberry River is a  tributary of the Middle Oconee River in the U.S. state of Georgia.  It rises in southeastern Hall County (Braselton) and flows southeast, forming the boundary between Jackson and Barrow counties, to join the Middle Oconee south of Jefferson.

The river's name is an accurate preservation of the native Creek-language name Tishmaugu.

See also
List of rivers of Georgia

References 

USGS Hydrologic Unit Map - State of Georgia (1974)

Rivers of Georgia (U.S. state)
Rivers of Hall County, Georgia
Rivers of Jackson County, Georgia
Rivers of Barrow County, Georgia